The Pierce County Courthouse is located in Blackshear, Georgia, on US 84.  It was built in 1902 at a cost of $20,000.  It is made of several shades of red brick with pink and white mortar. It has fluted columns made of metal.  There is a brick addition in the rear of the building.  The interior has a small rotunda.  It was added to the National Register of Historic Places in 1980.

References

External links
 

Courthouses on the National Register of Historic Places in Georgia (U.S. state)
Neoclassical architecture in Georgia (U.S. state)
Government buildings completed in 1902
Pierce County, Georgia
National Register of Historic Places in Pierce County, Georgia